Palazzo da Mula is a building in Murano, Italy.  It is not to be confused with the Palazzo da Mula Morosini, which is on the Grand Canal and was painted by Claude Monet during his trip to Venice in 1908.

Da Mula